Sagona was a village located on Sagona Island in Fortune Bay in the Gulf of St. Lawrence on the south coast of Newfoundland, Canada. It had a population of 223 in 1940 and 120 in 1956, and has been resettled in the late 1960s to towns on the south coast of Newfoundland.

See also
 List of communities in Newfoundland and Labrador

References

Populated places in Newfoundland and Labrador